Alireza Vafaei (born 6 January 1989) is an Iranian professional futsal player. He is a Left Winger, and currently a member of Giti Pasand in the Iranian Futsal Super League.

Honours

Country 
 AFC Futsal Championship
 Champion (1): 2016
 Runners-up (1): 2014
 Asian Indoor and Martial Arts Games
 Champion (1): 2013

Club 
 AFC Futsal Club Championship
 Runners-up (1): 2019 (Mes Sungun)
 Iranian Futsal Super League
 Runners-up (3): 2012–13 (Saba) - 2017–18 (Tasisat Daryaei) - 2020–21 (Giti Pasand)
 Iranian Futsal Hazfi Cup
 Champion (1): 2013–14 (Mahan Tandis)

Individual 
 Best player:
 Best futsal player of the 2014–15 Iranian Futsal Super League

References 

1989 births
Living people
People from Qom
Iranian men's futsal players
Futsal forwards
Almas Shahr Qom FSC players
Tasisat Daryaei FSC players
Ana Sanat FC players
Mes Sungun FSC players
Giti Pasand FSC players
21st-century Iranian people